Martin Pose (13 February 1911 – 1997) was an Argentine professional golfer.

Pose was born in Mar del Plata. He turned professional in 1930, and competed in Europe in 1939 and 1956; and on the PGA Tour in 1940 and 1948. His best finish on the PGA Tour was 9th place in the Bing Crosby Pro-Am in 1948. In 1939, he was 8th in the British Open. In 1940, along with Enrique Bertolino, he was the first Argentine player to compete in the Masters Tournament. He also played in the U.S. Open the same year.

In 1936, Pose won an exhibition match against Johnny Revolta in Buenos Aires. He was the first Argentine player to win a European tournament, the French Open 1939. 

Pose finished second in Brazil Open in 1953, Argentine Open in 1938 and the Argentine PGA Championship in 1935, 1937 and 1945.

Professional wins

European wins (1)
1939 French Open

Argentine wins (26)
1931 Ituzaingo Grand Prix
1933 Center Open, Argentine Open
1934 South Open
1935 South Open
1936 Argentine PGA Championship
1937 Abierto del Litoral
1938 South Open
1939 Center Open, Argentine Open
1940 Abierto del Litoral, South Open
1942 Argentine PGA Championship
1944 Center Open
1945 Abierto del Litoral
1946 Center Open
1947 Center Open, Swift Grand Prix
1949 South Open
1950 Center Open, Argentine Open
1954 Center Open, Argentine PGA Championship
1955 Juan Dentone Cup, Argentine PGA Championship
1956 Center Open

Other wins (2)
1945 Brazil Open
1954 Uruguay Open

Team appearances
Great Britain–Argentina Professional Match (representing Argentina): 1939
World Cup (representing Argentina): 1956

Argentine male golfers
Sportspeople from Mar del Plata
1911 births
1997 deaths